Cumhuriyet is a quarter of the town Gülpınar, Gülağaç District, Aksaray Province, Turkey. Its population is 871 (2021).

References

Gülağaç District